The 2000 World Snooker Championship (also referred to as the 2000 Embassy World Snooker Championship for the purposes of sponsorship) was a professional ranking snooker tournament that took place between 15 April and 1 May 2000 at the Crucible Theatre in Sheffield, England.

Stephen Hendry was the defending champion, but he lost in the first round 7–10 against Stuart Bingham.

Mark Williams won his first World title by defeating fellow Welsh player Matthew Stevens 18–16 in the final.  The tournament was sponsored by cigarette manufacturer Embassy.

Tournament summary
 In the final qualifying round Gary Wilkinson and Jason Ferguson set the record of the longest best-of-19-frames match at 11 hours and 38 minutes.
 The pre-tournament favourite Stephen Hendry was eliminated in the first round by Crucible debutant and future world champion Stuart Bingham (10–7). Hendry and Bingham would later meet in the first round again in 2012, this time Hendry winning 10-4 and making a maximum 147 break in what was his final professional tournament.
 Despite becoming the first player to make 5 centuries in a first round match at The Crucible, and outscoring his opponent, Ronnie O'Sullivan lost 9–10 to David Gray. This record was eventually equalled in 2020 when Mark Allen also made 5 centuries in his first round match.
 This year's edition of the tournament marked the only time that both Hendry and O'Sullivan were eliminated in the first round.
 Gray was unable to maintain his form in the second round and lost 1–13 to Dominic Dale with a session to spare, scoring just 208 points, a record low for a best-of-25 match.
 Joe Swail returned to the top 16 in the snooker world rankings after reaching the semi-final against Matthew Stevens.
 Swail's place in the semi-finals ended Steve Davis' run in the elite top 16 – he had been in since 1980 including holding the world number one spot from 1983 to 1990. Davis lost 11–13 to John Higgins in the second round. He later returned to the top 16 in 2003/2004.
 Higgins made a record of 485 unanswered points in his quarter-final match against Anthony Hamilton.
 Mark Williams became only the third Welsh snooker player to win the world title after Ray Reardon and Terry Griffiths, and the first since 1979. Trailing 7–13 against fellow countryman Matthew Stevens in the final, Williams recorded a comeback to defeat Stevens 18–16 and win the title.
 John Newton refereed his first and only World final and retired from refereeing after the match. This was also the first ever all-Welsh World final and remains the only one to-date.

Prize fund 
The breakdown of prize money for this year is shown below:

Winner: £240,000
Runner-up: £140,000
Semi-final: £70,000
Quarter-final: £35,000
Last 16: £19,000
Last 32: £13,000
Last 48: £10,000

Last 64: £6,325
Last 96: £3,850
Last 128: £1,050
Stage one highest break: £2,000
Stage two highest break: £20,000
Stage two maximum break: £147,000
Total: £1,460,000

Main draw
Shown below are the results for each round. The numbers in parentheses beside some of the players are their seeding ranks (each championship has 16 seeds and 16 qualifiers).

Century breaks 
There were 54 centuries in the Championship. The highest breaks were 143 made by Matthew Stevens in the televised stage and Nick Dyson in the qualifying stage.

 143, 120, 114, 114, 112, 111, 110, 109, 108, 104, 103  Matthew Stevens
 141, 141, 137, 136, 135, 129, 127, 126, 109, 108, 108, 103  John Higgins
 141, 103, 102  Joe Swail
 136, 123, 115, 102, 101  Ronnie O'Sullivan
 133  Drew Henry
 132  Stuart Bingham
 126, 102  Stephen Lee

 123, 112, 106, 105, 101, 101  Mark Williams
 120, 119, 103, 101, 100  Dominic Dale
 118, 106, 104, 101  Ken Doherty
 106  Stephen Hendry
 102  John Parrott
 101  Chris Small
 100  Peter Ebdon

Qualifying 

The qualifying matches were held between 3 January and 20 March 2000 at the Newport Centre in Newport, Wales.

Round 1–2

Round 3–4

References

2000
World Championship
World Snooker Championship
Sports competitions in Sheffield
April 2000 sports events in the United Kingdom
May 2000 sports events in the United Kingdom